Cristiano Migliorati (born 25 September 1968 in Brescia, Italy) is an Italian former Grand Prix motorcycle road racer. His best year was in 1996 when he finished fourteenth in the 250cc world championship. He was the 2004 Italian CIV Supersport Champion. He retired after the 2010 Italian CIV Supersport season.

Grand Prix career statistics
Points system from 1993 onwards:

(key) (Races in bold indicate pole position; races in italics indicate fastest lap)

References 

1968 births
Sportspeople from Brescia
Italian motorcycle racers
250cc World Championship riders
500cc World Championship riders
Living people
Supersport World Championship riders